The Church of St Mary is a Church of England parish church in Elland, West Yorkshire. The church is a Grade I listed building.

History
Stones in the chancel arch have been dated to approximately 1170 to 1180. Most of the present church dates from the 13th and 14th centuries. It was restored in 1856 by W. H. Crossland. The stained glass in the east window dates from the 15th century and depicts 21 scenes from the life of St Mary the Virgin. The church has a west tower, and a Sanctus bellcote on the gable of the nave.

On 24 January 1968, the church was designated a Grade I listed building.

Present day
The Church of St Mary is part of the Benefice of "Saint Mary the Virgin, Elland and All Saints, Elland" in the Archdeaconry of Halifax and the Huddersfield Episcopal Area of the Diocese of Leeds.

The parish stands in the Central to modern Catholic traditions of the Church of England.

Notable people

 Felix Arnott, later Archbishop of Brisbane, served his curacy in the benefice in the 1930s

See also
Grade I listed buildings in West Yorkshire
Grade I listed churches in West Yorkshire
Listed buildings in Elland

References

Bibliography

External links

 A Church Near You entry

Church of St Mary
13th-century church buildings in England
Church of England church buildings in West Yorkshire
Grade I listed churches in West Yorkshire